Ted Mann (April 16, 1916 – January 15, 2001) was an American businessman involved in the film industry and head of Mann Theatres. In 1973, he purchased the National General Theatre chain and changed the name of Grauman's Chinese Theatre, which was a part of the chain, to Mann's Chinese Theater.

Biography
Born to a Jewish family in Wishek, North Dakota, Mann started off in the movie business as an usher around the time he attended the University of Minnesota in the 1930s. He rented the Selby Theatre in Saint Paul, Minnesota, for $100 a month running it as a one-man shop serving as ticket seller and projectionist. He was successful and he went on to purchase 25 other theaters and drive-ins in the Midwest.

In 1970, Mann sold his theater chain to General Cinema Corporation (founded by Philip Smith and then led by Richard A. Smith) and moved to California. The first production to his credit was 1969's The Illustrated Man, based on a Ray Bradbury book. He didn't stay out of the theater business for long, and purchased the troubled 276-screen National General Theatre chain in 1973. Mann soon expanded the chain to 360 screens, but again sold off his theaters in 1986, this time to Gulf+Western, which later renamed itself to Paramount Communications (which itself became part of Viacom). Grauman's Theater eventually regained its original name in late 2001.

Both the Orpheum and Pantages venues of today's Hennepin Theatre District in Minneapolis were once owned by Mann. He eventually owned at least six theaters in the city's downtown region. The Ted Mann Concert Hall at the University of Minnesota in Minneapolis is named for him.

Philanthropy
In 1984, he founded the Ted Mann Foundation which contributed to the Salvation Army, Boys & Girls Clubs, United Way, Wilshire Boulevard Temple, the United Jewish Fund, Operation Exodus, and the Jerusalem Foundation.

Personal life
On June 24, 1934, Ted Mann married Ida Charon (1911–1997). Before their divorce, Ted and Ida Mann had two daughters, Victoria Mann Sims and Roberta Lynn Mann-Benson (died 2010). He married actress Rhonda Fleming in 1977, and they remained together until Mann died at age 84 in Los Angeles of complications from a stroke.

Filmography

Producer/executive producer
The Illustrated Man (1969)
Buster and Billie (1974)
Lifeguard (1976)
The Nude Bomb (1980)
Brubaker (1980)
Krull (1983)

References

External links

Jason Buchanan. Ted Mann Biography. Yahoo!/Allmovie.
(January 17, 2001). Theater entrepreneur Ted Mann dead at 84. Associated Press/CNN (archived version on Celebrity Deathwatch mailing list).

1916 births
2001 deaths
People from McIntosh County, North Dakota
Film exhibitors
American people of Jewish descent
Burials at Hillside Memorial Park Cemetery